Elizabeth Simpson may refer to:

 Elizabeth Simpson (archaeologist)
 Elizabeth Simpson (biologist)
 Elizabeth Inchbald (née Simpson) (1753–1821), English writer and actress

See also
 Lisa Simpson, a fictional character in the animated television series The Simpsons